Baisha Subdistrict is a subdistrict in Jiangbei District, Ningbo, Zhejiang, China. , it has 5 residential communities under its administration.

See also 
 List of township-level divisions of Zhejiang

References 

Township-level divisions of Zhejiang
Geography of Ningbo